The enzyme arylmalonate decarboxylase catalyzes the chemical reaction

2-aryl-2-methylmalonate  2-arylpropanoate + CO2

This enzyme belongs to the family of lyases, specifically the carboxy-lyases, which cleave carbon-carbon bonds.  The systematic name of this enzyme class is 2-aryl-2-methylmalonate carboxy-lyase (2-arylpropanoate-forming). Other names in common use include AMDASE, 2-aryl-2-methylmalonate carboxy-lyase, and 2-aryl-2-methylmalonate carboxy-lyase (2-arylpropionate-forming).

Structural studies

As of late 2007, only one structure has been solved for this class of enzymes, with the PDB accession code .

References

 

EC 4.1.1
Enzymes of known structure